Pleurobema decisum, the southern clubshell, is a species of freshwater mussel, an aquatic bivalve mollusk in the family Unionidae, the river mussels.

This species is endemic to the United States.  Its natural habitat is rivers. It is threatened by habitat loss. The species natural habitat is in Mississippi, Alabama, and Georgia (U.S. state).

References

Molluscs of the United States
decisum
Bivalves described in 1831
ESA endangered species
Taxonomy articles created by Polbot